QHR Technologies Inc. (QHR) is a Canadian healthcare technology company, founded in 2000. It represents 20 percent of the country's medical record market and its Medeo and AccuroEMR products are used by about 16,400 health professionals.

History
In 2013, QHR sold Quadrant to Logibec Groupe Informatique.

In 2014, QHR acquired Medeo, a patient-doctor online connection application developer whose virtual care application is used by about 5,000 physicians in British Columbia.

In 2016, Olympic athlete Hayley Wickenheiser joined QHR as a spokesperson.

In June 2016, QHR announced plans to collaborate with TELUS Health to improve communications between healthcare providers. The companies intend to create a secure electronic communication solution to allow the more than 23,000 Canadian physicians on their EMR platforms to communicate seamlessly, regardless of the EMR platform they're on.

In August 2016, QHR received a $170 million purchase offer from Loblaw Companies, the consortium owning Shopper's Drug Mart, Canada's largest chain of pharmacies. The board approved the offer and QHR was purchased by Loblaw Companies.

Medeo

Medeo is QHR's virtual care technology which connects health providers with their patients online for private video visits, secure messaging, and other virtual care applications. Patients are able to connect with their health providers via smartphone (iOS or Android), tablet, or computer. The company that initially developed the app (Medeo) was acquired by QHR in November 2014.

Medeo has been used for general consultations, prescriptions, follow-ups, specialist referrals, and all non-emergencies.

References

External links

Canadian companies established in 2000
Companies based in Kelowna
Medical technology companies of Canada
Electronic health record software companies
2000 establishments in British Columbia
Health care companies established in 2000